The men's 10,000 metres event was part of the track and field athletics programme at the 1924 Summer Olympics. The competition was held on Sunday, July 6, 1924.

Paavo Nurmi the greatest long-distance runner at that time did not compete in this race, as the Finnish officials asked him not to start in this event. They thought he was entered in too many competitions. Only a few weeks after the Olympics on August 31 Nurmi set a new world record with 30:06.2 in Kuopio.

As for all other races the track was 500 metres in circumference.

The exact number of starters is unknown, but photographs show around 35 competitors. At least 33 - maybe 36 - long-distance runners from 16 nations competed.

Records
These were the standing world and Olympic records (in minutes) prior to the 1924 Summer Olympics.

Ville Ritola set a new world record with 30:23.2 minutes.

Results

It is unknown if Singh Randhawa, Mangaschia, and Redda actually competed.

References

External links
Olympic Report
 

Men's 10000 metres
10,000 metres at the Olympics